PAS 43 is a British Standard for safe working in recovery of broken-down vehicles.

, the latest standard is PAS 43:2015.

References 

British Standards
Road safety in the United Kingdom
Occupational safety and health
Emergency road services
Trucks